Klinovka is a rural locality (a village) in Vozdvizhensky Selsoviet, Alsheyevsky District, Bashkortostan, Russia. The population was 1 as of 2010. There is 1 street.

Geography 
Klinovka is located 47 km southwest of Rayevsky (the district's administrative centre) by road. Novovozdvizhenka is the nearest rural locality.

References 

Rural localities in Alsheyevsky District